The Worst Thing About My Sister is a book by Jacqueline Wilson about a young girl called Marty and her elder sister, Melissa. It is recommended for ages 9–11.

Plot
Martina ("Marty") is a tomboy who loves animals and drawing comics that feature a character she created, Mighty Mart. Her elder sister Melissa loves the colour pink and make-up and is very feminine; Melissa does not get along with Marty. Their mother makes dresses and is a school secretary, and their father is a travel agent who is losing most of his income because of the rise in online booking.

Marty was invited to a party hosted by a girl named Alisha just because her mum made a dress for Alisha. Her mother forces Marty to attend and makes a blue party dress. When she comes and picks her up she talks to the owner of the dancing school where the party was held. The owner announces that she wants Marty's mum to make some costumes for the children and other parents want bridesmaids dresses. This means their mother has to expand – she needs an extra room to sew in, so Marty and Melissa need to share a room. It gets decorated but the room's decor is mostly chosen by Melissa as she is the eldest. At school, mean girls call Marty "bluebottle" because of her dress. Marty sneaks in raw eggs and throws them at the bullies resulting in some disastrous consequences. Marty invites her best friend Jaydene to look at her new room,  but Jaydene acts like she prefers Melissa to Marty, which annoys her. When Melissa shows her friends the room, she is shocked to find Marty has trashed the room. Marty brings up some smoothies as an apology and is horrified to find out that Melissa is mocking her homemade animals. Marty embarrasses her by showing her friends Melissa's toy Baba, and Melissa swears she will take revenge.

In the morning Marty can't find all her animals and as the bin men had already been, presumes that Melissa has thrown them in the bin. Marty begins to pull off Baba's limbs but as a shocked Melissa climbs up the bunk bed ladder to get to Marty, the ladder breaks and causes her to lose her grip and fall. Melissa gets taken to a hospital where she is visited by Marty.  Marty and her dad return home and she finds her animals were under the bed all along. Marty sews together Baba and takes it to the hospital where the sisters reconcile.  The story ends with Marty saying how much she loves Melissa.

References 

2012 British novels
2012 children's books
British children's novels
Novels by Jacqueline Wilson
Novels about siblings
Doubleday (publisher) books
Novel about animals